In theoretical physics, an invariant is an observable of a physical system which remains unchanged under some transformation. Invariance, as a broader term, also applies to the no change of form of physical laws under a transformation, and is closer in scope to the mathematical definition. Invariants of a system are deeply tied to the symmetries imposed by its environment.

Invariance is an important concept in modern theoretical physics, and many theories are expressed in terms of their symmetries and invariants.

Examples

In classical and quantum mechanics, invariance of space under translation results in momentum being an invariant and the conservation of momentum, whereas invariance of the origin of time, i.e. translation in time, results in energy being an invariant and the conservation of energy. In general, by Noether's theorem, any invariance of a physical system under a continuous symmetry leads to a fundamental conservation law. 

In crystals, the electron density is periodic and invariant with respect to discrete translations by unit cell vectors. In very few materials, this symmetry can be broken due to enhanced electron correlations.

Another examples of physical invariants are the speed of light, and charge and mass of a particle observed from two reference frames moving with respect to one another (invariance under a spacetime Lorentz transformation), and invariance of time and acceleration under a Galilean transformation between two such frames moving at low velocities. 

Quantities can be invariant under some common transformations but not under others. For example, the velocity of a particle is invariant when switching coordinate representations from rectangular to curvilinear coordinates, but is not invariant when transforming between frames of reference that are moving with respect to each other. Other quantities, like the speed of light, are always invariant.

Physical laws are said to be invariant under transformations when their predictions remain unchanged. This generally means that the form of the law (e.g. the type of differential equations used to describe the law) is unchanged in transformations so that no additional or different solutions are obtained.

Covariance and contravariance generalize the mathematical properties of invariance in tensor mathematics, and are frequently used in electromagnetism, special relativity, and general relativity.

See also 

 Casimir operator
 Charge (physics)
 Conservation law
 Conserved quantity
 General covariance
 Eigenvalues and eigenvectors
 Invariants of tensors
 Killing form
 Physical constant
 Scalar (physics)
 Symmetry (physics)
 Uniformity of nature
 Weyl transformation

References 

Conservation laws
Physical quantities